Rosario Alessandro Bucolo (born 7 October 1988) is an Italian footballer who plays as a midfielder for Serie D club Acireale.

Club career
On 3 January 2020, he signed a 1.5-year contract with Sicula Leonzio.

On 31 July 2021, he joined to Mantova. On 14 January 2022, his contract with Mantova was terminated by mutual consent. On the next day, he returned to Potenza.

References

External links

1988 births
Living people
Footballers from Catania
Footballers from Sicily
Italian footballers
Association football midfielders
Serie C players
Serie D players
Catania S.S.D. players
S.S.D. Città di Gela players
U.S. Catanzaro 1929 players
A.C. Reggiana 1919 players
Celano F.C. Marsica players
S.S. Milazzo players
A.C.R. Messina players
A.S. Martina Franca 1947 players
Calcio Padova players
A.S.D. Sicula Leonzio players
S.S.D. Acireale Calcio 1946 players
Potenza Calcio players
Mantova 1911 players